The Diocese of Worcester is a Latin Church ecclesiastical territory, or diocese, of the Catholic Church in the New England region of the United States. The diocese consists of  Worcester County in central Massachusetts. 

The Diocese of Worcester is headed by a bishop who has his see at the Cathedral of Saint Paul in the city of Worcester. The fifth and current bishop is Robert McManus. The Diocese of Worcester is a suffragan diocese in the ecclesiastical province of the metropolitan Archdiocese of Boston.

History

Early history 
Before the American Revolution, the British Province of Massachusetts Bay, which included the Worcester area, had enacted laws prohibiting the practice of Catholicism in the colony. It was even illegal for a priest to reside there. To gain the support of Catholics for the Revolution, colonial leaders were forced to make concessions.  Massachusetts enacted religious freedom for Catholics in 1780.

Pope Pius VII erected the Diocese of Boston on April 8, 1808, including all of New England in its jurisdiction. On June 14, 1870, Pope Pius IX erected the Diocese of Springfield from the Diocese of Boston.  The new diocese included Worcester County.

1950 to 2004 
Pope Pius XII erected the Diocese of Worcester on March 7, 1950.  He removed Worcester County from the Diocese of Springfield in Massachusetts to created the new diocese, a suffragan of the Archdiocese of Boston.  Pius XII designated the Church of St. Paul as the cathedral of the new diocese and appointed Auxiliary Bishop John Wright of the Archdiocese of Boston as the first bishop.  

In 1959. Pope John XXXIII appointed Wright as bishop of the Diocese of Pittsburgh and named Bishop Bernard Flanagan of the Diocese of Norwich as his successor. On April 2, 1968, Timothy Harrington was appointed as an auxiliary bishop of the diocese by Pope Paul VI.  In 1973, the diocese joined the Worcester County Ecumenical Council, a predominantly Protestant organization.

After Flannagan's retirement in 1983, Pope John Paul II appointed Harrington as the new bishop of Worcester.  Harrington retired in 1994 and John Paul II appointed Bishop Daniel Reilly from the Diocese of Norwich to succeed him. During his tenure in Worcester, Reilly reopened St. Joseph Parish but merged it with Notre Dame des Canadiens Parish in Worcester. He raised over $50 million for his Forward in Faith campaign to place the diocese in a stable financial condition.

2004 to present 
When Reilly retired in 2004, John Paul II appointed Auxiliary Bishop Robert McManus from the Diocese of Providence to replace him.  He is the current bishop of Worcester.

McManus in 2007 criticized the College of the Holy Cross in Worcester for renting out "sacred space" to the Massachusetts Alliance on Teen Pregnancy for workshops. He said that the Alliance taught subjects that violated Catholic teachings. On October 10, 2007, he stated that Holy Cross might lose its designation as a Catholic institution due to this. Holy Cross President Michael C. McFarland said that the college had contractual obligations to the Alliance and would not cancel its agreement.

In April 2012, McManus asked Anna Maria College in Paxton, Massachusetts, to rescind an invitation to activist Victoria Kennedy to speak at its commencement ceremony, citing her views on abortion rights for women and same sex marriage. On May 4, 2012, the college agreed to disinvite Kennedy, but also disinvited McManus, stating that his presence at the ceremony would be a "distraction".

In June 2012, diocesan officials declined to sell Oakhurst, an historic mansion in Northbridge, Massachusetts used as a retreat center, to James Fairbanks and Alain Beret, a married gay couple. In September 2012, the couple sued McManus and the diocese for discrimination.  They cited an email in which church officials said that McManus wanted to stop the sale "because of the potentiality of gay marriages there."  On October 12, 2012, the diocese sold the property to a different buyer.

McManus was arrested on May 4, 2013, in Narragansett, Rhode Island for drunken driving, leaving the scene of an accident, and refusing a chemical sobriety test. At 10:30 pm, McManus had been involved in a crash with another vehicle, then fled the scene.  The other driver followed him and called the police.  They arrested McManus 20 minutes later at his family home in Narragansett.On June 3, 2017, in commemoration of the 100th anniversary of the three secrets of Fátima in Portugal, McManus consecrated the diocese to the Immaculate Heart of Mary.  The Shrine of Mary, Mother of Persecuted Christians was opened in Clinton, Massachusetts, on October 20, 2022 .  It was started by Father Benedict Kiely Nasarean.org, an organization advocating for Christians facing persecution in the Middle East.

Sexual abuse
On August 31, 1997, the Dallas Morning News released a 1968 letter sent by Bishop Flanagan to Reverend Jerome Hayden, a Catholic therapist in Holliston, Massachusetts. In his letter, Flanagan stated that Reverend David A. Holley, a diocesan priest; "...has been ... [accused of] molesting teenage boys on at least two occasions—most recently in a hospital from which he has been barred—and with carrying around and showing to these boys pornographic magazines and books. Although the ... [accusations] were established beyond any doubt in the judgment of the priests who assisted me in the investigation as well as myself, Father has denied any wrongdoing."The Dallas Morning News in 1997 released more letters showing that in 1970, after receiving accusations against Holley, the diocese transferred him to the Seton Institute in Baltimore, Maryland without notifying law enforcement. 

In May 2020, the Albuquerque Journal that the diocese was being sued in New Mexico by a person who claimed that Holley sexually abused him in the 1970s. The lawsuit, which named other dioceses in which Holley served, faulted the Diocese of Worcester with "most of the blame." Holley had been convicted of sexual abuse in New Mexico in 1993 and sentenced to 55 to 275 years.  He died in prison in 2008.

On October 1, 2020, Bishop McManus and the diocese were named in a sexual abuse lawsuit filed by a former parishioner. The plaintiff alleged that Reverend Thomas E. Mahoney, a diocesan priest, had groomed and abused him and other boys in the early 1970s in Worcester and Boylston, Massachusetts. The lawsuit accused the diocese of failing to stop Mahoney's alleged crimes. After the lawsuit was filed, McManus suspended Mahoney, already retired, from any ministerial duties.

Bishops

Bishops of Worcester
 John Joseph Wright (1950-1959), appointed Bishop of Pittsburgh and later Prefect of the Congregation for the Clergy (elevated to Cardinal in 1969) 
 Bernard Joseph Flanagan (1959-1983)
 Timothy Joseph Harrington (1983-1994)
 Daniel Patrick Reilly (1994-2004)
 Robert Joseph McManus (2004–present)

Auxiliary bishops
 Timothy Joseph Harrington (1968-1983), appointed Bishop of Worcester
 George Edward Rueger (1988-2005)

Other bishops who had been priests of the Diocese of Worcester
 Michael Wallace Banach, appointed Apostolic Nuncio and Titular Archbishop in 2013

Organization of parishes
In 2004, Bishop Reilly grouped parishes into "clusters". The purpose of this system is to allow communities to come together for regional events. Also, priests may substitute for one another at a particular parish.

High schools
 St Paul Diocesan Junior/Senior High School, Worcester
 Immaculate Heart of Mary*, Harvard
 Notre Dame Academy, Worcester
 Notre Dame Preparatory School, Fitchburg
 St. Bernard's High School, Fitchburg
 St. John's High School, Shrewsbury
 St. Mary's Central Catholic High School, Worcester
 Trivium School*, Lancaster

 * Operates independent of the Diocese

Closed
 Magnificat Academy, Warren
 Saint Peter-Marian High School, Worcester
 Holy Name Central Catholic High School, Worcester

Administrators
Robert Joseph McManus, Bishop
Daniel P. Reilly, Bishop Emeritus
Richard F. Reidy, Vicar General and Moderator of the Curia
F. Stephen Pedone, Judicial Vicar
Paul T. O'Connell, Associate Judicial Vicar
Raymond L. Delisle, Chancellor of Operations
James Mazzone, Director of Priest Personnel
Paula Kelleher, Vicar for Religious
James P. Moroney, Diocesan Office of Liturgy
Donato Infante III, Director of Vocations

See also

 Ecclesiastical Province of Boston

References

External links

Catholic Hierarchy Profile of the Diocese of Worcester
2012-2013 Worcester Diocesan Directory

 
Catholic Church in Massachusetts
Worcester
Worcester
Worcester
1950 establishments in Massachusetts
Religion in Worcester County, Massachusetts